The Gonostomatidae are a family of mesopelagic marine fish, commonly named bristlemouths, lightfishes, or anglemouths. It is a relatively small family, containing only eight known genera and 32 species. However, bristlemouths make up for their lack of diversity with relative abundance, numbering in the hundreds of trillions to quadrillions. The genera Cyclothone (with 13 species) is thought to be one of the most abundant vertebrate genera in the world. 

The fossil record of this family dates back to the Miocene epoch. Living bristlemouths were discovered by William Beebe in the early 1930s and described by L. S. Berg in 1958. The fish are mostly found in the Atlantic, Indian, and Pacific Oceans, although the species Cyclothone microdon may be found in Arctic waters. They have a number of green or red light-producing photophores aligned along the undersides of their heads or bodies. Their chief common name, bristlemouth, comes from their odd, equally sized, and bristle-like teeth. They are typically black in color which provides camouflage from predators in deep, dark waters. They mainly feed on zooplankton and small crustaceans due to their small size.

Morphology 
Bristlemouths are protandrous, therefore a male first hermaphrodite. They begin their lives as males and some of them switch to female. Male bristlemouths are smaller than females.

Bristlemouths have large jaws that are capable of catching prey larger than themselves. The length of the S. glarisianus's (a species of Bristlemouth) lower jaw is equaled to 70% of the entire length of their head. The lower jaw of the Bristlemouths is not functional in terms of masticating their prey. It is therefore hypothesized that they swallow their prey tail first.

Bristlemouths are extremely small, measuring on average 75 mm. Bristlemouths have elongated bodies, small eyes, short snouts, large mouths, and large jaws. The position of the dorsal fin begins in line with the anal fin. The difference between bristlemouths species is found in the intensity of their pigmentation and photophore size. For the majority of the species, the morphology remains the same.

Bristlemouths are mostly dark in pigmentation but at times can display translucently. Bristlemouths contain a pineal organ which functions to detect slow changing ambient light. This allows the Bristlemouth to have control over its circadian clock and seasonal behavior.

Due to the small size of the fish, they are easy prey to dragonfish and fangtooths.

Taxonomy
Some classifications include the genera Pollichthys and Vinciguerria, but this article follows FishBase in placing them in the family Phosichthyidae.

Some classifications include species in the genus Zaphotias, but these are junior synonyms of the species Bonapartia pedaliota.

Feeding habits 

Brislemouths feed mostly on zooplankton and small crustaceans. Their diet is composed of a range from 92-98% of Crustacea. A minor part of their diet is made up of opportunistic encounters with smaller fish. Brislemouths that consume fish prey are found in individuals ranging from 70 mm to 75 mm. Bristlemouths do not have seasonal trends when it comes to their feeding habits.

Bristlemouths are diel vertical migrators, therefore migrating closer to the surface waters in the nighttime in order to find more food. Out of the thirteen bristlemouth species, eight have been found near the surface therefore explaining their DVM behaviors.

Bristlemouths are able to efficiently capture their prey due to their bioluminescent nature.

Bioluminescence 
Bristlemouths are light emitting fish. Bristlemouths rely on their bioluminescence for different outcomes. Some rely on it to find prey while others use it to avoid predation. However, the most common way that their bioluminescence is used is to signal between fish in the same way people "dance or wear bright colors at the nightclub."

References

 

 
Extant Miocene first appearances
Ray-finned fish families